Bertoldo is an Italian origin word which is used as a surname and a masculine given name. People with the name include:

Surname
Arduino Bertoldo (1932–2012), Italian Roman Catholic bishop 
Fellipe Bertoldo (born 1991), Brazilian football player
Vito Bertoldo (1916–1966), American soldier

Given name
Bertoldo Batawang, Jr. (born 1971), commonly known as Bert Batawang, Filipino boxer
Bertoldo di Giovanni (after 1420–1491), Italian sculptor and medallist
Bertoldo Klinger (1884—1969), Brazilian army general

See also
 Bertoldo (disambiguation)

Surnames of Italian origin
Italian masculine given names